Zachary Daniel Cunningham (born December 2, 1994) is an American football linebacker who is a free agent. He played college football at Vanderbilt and was selected in the second round of the 2017 NFL Draft by the Houston Texans. He also played for the Tennessee Titans.

Early years
Cunningham attended Pinson Valley High School in Pinson, Alabama. During his high school football career, he had 448 tackles, including 194 as a senior. He committed to Vanderbilt University to play college football.

College career
After not playing during his first year at Vanderbilt in 2013, Cunningham played in 11 games as a redshirt freshman in 2014, recording 67 tackles and 1.5 sacks. As a redshirt sophomore in 2015, he played in all 12 games with nine starts. He finished the year with 103 tackles and 4.5 sacks and was named first-team All-SEC. In 2016, Cunningham became the first unanimous All-American in school history and was the seventh to earn the All-American honors overall. He was a finalist for the Butkus Award as the nation's top linebacker.

Cunningham had an SEC-best 119 total tackles, which ranked 11th overall nationally. He also registered 16.5 tackles for loss, finishing second in the SEC and 22nd nationally, along with four fumble recoveries, which tied for second nationally, just one behind the leader. Cunningham played his best games against SEC opponents, as he posted 89 total tackles, 51 solo tackles and 12 tackles for loss against SEC foes. He also had some of the best individual plays in those games, including a big fourth down tackle to end Georgia's game ending drive in the Commodores' win in Athens. Cunningham made another huge, nationally-recognized play in the fourth quarter of Vanderbilt's game against Auburn, when he perfectly timed a leap over Auburn's left guard as the ball was snapped on a field goal attempt, allowing him to arrive in the backfield at the same time as the ball, which Cunningham then blocked the field goal to preserve Vanderbilt's chances to win with less than 2:00 minutes remaining in the contest. A late interception by Auburn preserved the Tigers' victory, but Cunningham's leap was named Top Ten Play of the Day by ESPN.

Professional career
Cunningham received an invitation to the NFL Combine and completed all of the combine and positional drills. He also participated in Vanderbilt's Pro Day and opted to only run positional drills for representatives and scouts in attendance. He attended private workouts with three NFL teams: the Denver Broncos, Pittsburgh Steelers, and Jacksonville Jaguars.

At the conclusion of the pre-draft process, Cunningham was projected to be a first or second round pick by NFL draft experts and scouts. He was ranked the third best linebacker prospect in the draft by Sports Illustrated, the third best outside linebacker by NFL analyst Bucky Brooks, the fourth best outside linebacker by NFLDraftScout.com, the fourth best linebacker by NFL analyst Mike Mayock, and was ranked the fifth best linebacker by ESPN.

Houston Texans 
The Houston Texans selected Cunningham in the second round with the 57th overall pick in the 2017 NFL Draft.

On May 12, 2017, the Houston Texans signed Cunningham to a four-year, $4.47 million contract that includes $2.06 million guaranteed and a signing bonus of $1.39 million.

2017 
Cunningham competed with Dylan Cole and Sio Moore for the starting left inside linebacker job with original starter Brian Cushing suspended for the first ten games of the season. Head coach Bill O'Brien named Cunningham the starter to begin the regular season.

He made his professional regular season debut during the Houston Texans' season-opening 29–7 loss to the Jacksonville Jaguars and finished the game with five combined tackle and a pass deflection. The following week, Cunningham earned his first career start and recorded six combined tackles as the Texans defeated the Cincinnati Bengals, 13–9. On October 8, 2017, he collected nine combined tackles and forced the first fumble of his career during a 42–34 loss to the Kansas City Chiefs. In Week 13, Cunningham recorded four combined tackles and made his first career sack on Titans' quarterback Marcus Mariota in the Texans' 24–13 loss at the Tennessee Titans. In Week 17, he collected a season-high 12 combined tackles (four solo) during a 22–13 loss at the Indianapolis Colts. He finished his rookie season in 2017 with 90 combined tackles (45 solo), six pass deflections, and 1.5 sacks in 16 games and 13 starts.

2018
Cunningham entered training camp slated as a starting inside linebacker after Brian Cushing officially announced his retirement. Head coach Bill O'Brien named Cunningham and Whitney Mercilus the starting outside linebackers, along with middle linebacker Benardrick McKinney. He finished the 2018 season with 107 tackles, two forced fumbles, one fumble recovery, five pass breakups, and one interception.

2019
In Week 2 against the Jacksonville Jaguars, Cunningham made a team high 10 tackles and sacked quarterback Gardner Minshew once as the Texans won 13–12.
In Week 12 against the Indianapolis Colts on Thursday Night Football, Cunningham recorded a team high 16 tackles in the 20–17 win.
In Week 14 against the Denver Broncos, Cunningham recorded a team high 17 tackles (12 solo) during the 38–24 loss. He started all 16 games and recorded 142 total tackles (sixth in the league), two fumble recoveries, and two sacks..

2020
On August 30, 2020, the Texans signed Cunningham to a four-year, $58 million contract extension with $23.5 million guaranteed, making him one of the highest paid inside linebackers in the NFL.

In Week 2 against the Baltimore Ravens, Cunningham recorded a team high 15 tackles (11 solo) and sacked Lamar Jackson once during the 33–16 loss.

2021
Cunningham played in 8 games and missed 2 games for the Houston Texans in 2021. He recorded 67 total tackles, one forced fumble and three pass deflections. Texans coach David Culley benched Cunningham twice over the season for violating team rules. The Texans waived Cunningham on December 8, 2021.

Tennessee Titans
The Tennessee Titans claimed Cunningham off waivers on December 9, 2021.

On November 12, 2022, Cunningham was placed on injured reserve. He was activated on December 23. The Titans released him on February 22, 2023.

References

External links
Tennessee Titans bio
Vanderbilt Commodores bio

1994 births
Living people
All-American college football players
American football linebackers
Houston Texans players
People from Jefferson County, Alabama
Players of American football from Alabama
Tennessee Titans players
Vanderbilt Commodores football players